is the eighth single by Japanese recording artist Arisa Mizuki. It was released on February 13, 1995, as the first single from Mizuki's fourth studio album Cute.

The title track was written and produced by Tetsuya Komuro. It served as theme song for the Fuji TV drama Help!, starring Mizuki herself. A second take of "Anata no Sedai e Kuchizuke o", sung on a higher key, was recorded for Mizuki's compilation album Arisa's Favorite: T.K. Songs. The B-side, "Aru Hi, Aru Asa, Koibito wa," was also written and produced by Komuro, while the music was composed Cozy Kubo.

Chart performance 
"Anata no Sedai e Kuchizuke o" debuted on the Oricon Weekly Singles chart at number 9 with 64,780 copies sold in its first week. The single charted for six weeks and has sold a total of 131,640 copies.

Track listing

Charts and sales

References 

1995 singles
Alisa Mizuki songs
Japanese television drama theme songs
Song recordings produced by Tetsuya Komuro
Songs written by Tetsuya Komuro
1995 songs
Nippon Columbia singles